Ristiseiska is a popular card game in Finland for three to five players. The goal is to use up all of the cards in a player's hand. Rectangular grids of cards are built according to specific rules. It is a version of the card game Domino.

The person holding the seven of clubs begins, and play proceeds clockwise. The players must play from their hands, if possible, on their turn, and if they cannot, they must take a card from the previous player. Upon playing a king or an ace, the player can also choose to play an additional card. The first player to run out of cards wins. 

The game can be played in rounds, adding up scores from individuals rounds until a set point number is reached. Winners get zero points, while other players get points depending on the values of their remaining cards.

References

Shedding-type card games
Finnish card games